Sergio Bermejo Lillo (born 17 August 1997) is a Spanish professional footballer who plays for Real Zaragoza. Mainly an attacking midfielder, he can also play as a winger.

Club career
Bermejo was born in Madrid, and finished his formation with Getafe CF. He made his senior debut with the reserves on 1 May 2015, starting in a 0–1 Segunda División B home loss against SD Amorebieta.

On 15 January 2017, after being rarely used, Bermejo was loaned to fellow Tercera División side CD Móstoles URJC until June. Upon returning, he became an undisputed starter for the Azulones' B-team.

On 20 June 2018, Bermejo signed for CDA Navalcarnero in division three. On 18 December, however, he agreed to a four-year deal with RC Celta de Vigo and was assigned to the B-side also in the third tier.

Bermejo made his first team – and La Liga – debut on 30 October 2019, coming on as a late substitute for Denis Suárez in a 1–2 loss against Real Betis. The following 18 August, he signed a four-year contract with Real Zaragoza in Segunda División, after terminating his contract with Celta.

References

External links
 
 
 

1997 births
Living people
Footballers from Madrid
Spanish footballers
Association football midfielders
La Liga players
Segunda División players
Segunda División B players
Tercera División players
Getafe CF B players
CD Móstoles URJC players
CDA Navalcarnero players
Celta de Vigo B players
RC Celta de Vigo players
Real Zaragoza players